Acacia dealbata, the silver wattle, blue wattle or mimosa, is a species of flowering plant in the legume family Fabaceae, native to southeastern Australia in New South Wales, Victoria, Tasmania, and the Australian Capital Territory, and widely introduced in Mediterranean, warm temperate, and highland tropical landscapes.

Description

It is a fast-growing evergreen tree or shrub growing up to 30 m tall, typically a pioneer species after fire. The leaves are bipinnate, glaucous blue-green to silvery grey, 1–12 cm (occasionally to 17 cm) long and 1–11 cm broad, with 6–30 pairs of pinnae, each pinna divided into 10–68 pairs of leaflets; the leaflets are 0.7–6 mm long and 0.4–1 mm broad. The flowers are produced in large racemose inflorescences made up of numerous smaller globose bright yellow flowerheads of 13–42 individual flowers. The fruit is a flattened pod 2–11.5 cm long and 6–14 mm broad, containing several seeds. Trees generally do not live longer than 30 to 40 years, after which in the wild they are succeeded by other species where bushfires are excluded. In moist mountain areas, a white lichen can almost cover the bark, which may contribute to the descriptor  "silver". The Latin specific epithet dealbata also means "covered in a white powder". The Wiradjuri people of New South Wales use the name Giigandul for the species.

Chemistry
It has been analyzed as containing less than 0.02% alkaloids. It is known to contain enanthic (heptanoic) acid, palmic aldehyde, anisic acid, acetic acid, and phenols.

Taxonomy
Along with other bipinnate wattles, Acacia dealbata is classified in the section Botrycephalae within the subgenus Phyllodineae in the genus Acacia. An analysis of genomic and chloroplast DNA along with morphological characters found that the section is polyphyletic, though the close relationships of many species were unable to be resolved. Acacia dealbata appears to be most closely related to A. mearnsii, A. nanodealbata and A. baileyana.

Some authorities consider A. dealbata to be a variant of Acacia decurrens.

Subspecies
There are two subspecies:
A. dealbata subsp. dealbata. Low to moderate altitudes. Tree to 30 m; leaves mostly 5–12 cm long.
A. dealbata subsp. subalpina Tindale & Kodela. High altitudes in the Snowy Mountains. Shrub to 5 m (rarely 10 m) tall; leaves mostly 1.5–8.5 cm long.

Cultivation

Acacia dealbata is widely cultivated as an ornamental plant in warm temperate regions of the world, and is naturalised in some areas, including Sochi (Black Sea coast of Russia), southwestern Western Australia, southeastern South Australia, Norfolk Island, the Mediterranean region from Portugal to Greece and Morocco to Israel, Yalta (Crimea, Ukraine), California, Madagascar, southern Africa (South Africa, Zimbabwe), the highlands of southern India, south-western China and Chile. It prefers a sheltered position in full sun, with acid or neutral soil. It has gained the Royal Horticultural Society's Award of Garden Merit.

Mimosa
The flowers and tip shoots are harvested for use as cut flowers, when it is known by the florist trade as "mimosa" (not to be confused with the genus of plants called Mimosa). In Italy, Albania, Russia and Georgia the flowers are also frequently given to women on International Women's Day. The essence of the flowers, called 'mimosa', or in older texts, 'cassie', is used in perfumes.

Other uses
The Ngunnawal people of the ACT and Wiradjuri people of NSW used the bark to make coarse rope and string, the resinous sap for glue or to mix with ash to make poultices, the timber for tools, and the seeds to make flour.
The timber is useful for furniture and indoor work, but has limited uses, mainly in craft furniture and turning.  It  has a honey colour, often with distinctive figures like birdseye and tiger stripes. It has a medium weight (540–720 kg/m3), and is similar to its close relative blackwood, but of lighter tone without the dark heartwood.

The leaves are sometimes used in Indian chutney.

Invasive species
In South Africa, the species is a Category 1 weed in the Western Cape (requiring eradication) and Category 2 weed (requiring control outside plantation areas) elsewhere.  In New Zealand the Department of Conservation class it as an environmental weed. In Spain, due to its colonizing potential and constituting a serious threat to native species, habitats or ecosystems, this species has been included in the Spanish Catalog of Invasive Exotic Species, regulated by Royal Decree 630/2013, of 2 of August, being prohibited in Spain, except the Canary Islands and the Balearic Islands, its introduction into the natural environment, possession, transport, traffic and commerce.
In Portugal, the species makes part of the official list of invasive species (along with other Acacia species).
In California, the species is invasive and appears to displace many native species, also threatening the habitat of the endangered Mount Hermon June beetle.

See also

List of Acacia species

References

dealbata
Fabales of Australia
Flora of New South Wales
Flora of Tasmania
Flora of Victoria (Australia)
Trees of Australia